Nicky Hoberman (born 1967) is a South African-born, London-based fine artist/painter whose style includes the use of photorealism combined with caricature, and illogical figures on a background of flat, even spaces.

Early life and education
Nicky Hoberman was born in Cape Town, South Africa in 1967.  She attended Worcester College of Oxford University from 1986–89, where she received an MA in Modern History. From 1989-1993 she went to the Parsons School of Design in Paris and received a BA in Fine Art. In 1992 Hoberman attended the Yale Summer School of Art in the USA, and received an MA in Painting from the Chelsea College of Art and Design in London, where she attended from 1994-1995.

Career and Honors
Beginning in the mid-1990s, Hoberman has had a number of group and solo exhibitions in the United States, Italy, Switzerland, Germany, Belgium, New Zealand, and England. In 1996 she was chosen for the 1996 New Contemporaries at Tate Liverpool. She was also included in Saatchi’s "New Neurotic Realism" exhibition in 1998.  She participated in group shows in the Museum of Contemporary Art, Chicago, the Museum of Contemporary Art, Sydney, the Melbourne National Gallery of Victoria and Magasin 3 in Stockholm. Hoberman has also had three solo shows at Feigen Contemporary in New York.

Bibliography
Mick Finch, Stuart Morgan, Nicky Hoberman, Entwistle, London, 1998.
Susan Hitch, Gianni Romano, Nicky Hoberman, Gabrius, Milan, 2002.

References

1967 births
Living people
Photorealist artists
South African women painters
South African contemporary artists
Artists from Cape Town
Alumni of Worcester College, Oxford
20th-century South African painters
21st-century South African painters
20th-century South African women artists
21st-century South African women artists